This is a list of mayors of Queenstown Borough in New Zealand. The mayor was the head of the Queenstown Borough Council. The borough existed from 1866 until 1986, when it merged with the Lake County to form Queenstown-Lakes District. During the 120 years of its existence, there were 21 mayors.

Queenstown Borough Council
The Queenstown Borough Council was constituted in 1866. James William Robertson was elected as the first mayor in July 1866. John Davies was the last mayor of the borough council (1983–1986) and became the first mayor of Queenstown-Lakes (1986–1989).

The following list is complete:

Place names

Some streets and places in Queenstown are named after former borough council mayors; Robertson Street in Frankton, Hallenstein Street, Malaghan Road and Malaghan Street, Warren Park, Hotop Rise, Reid Street, St. Omer Park, Anderson Heights, Robins Road, Grant Road, and Davies Place.

References

 
Queenstown Borough